Podul Grant (Grant Bridge) is a bridge for motorway and lightrail in Bucharest, Romania. It is named after Effingham Grant, the British consul in Bucharest in the mid-19th century. Initially, the bridge was made of steel, and opened in 1910. Between 1979 and 1982, the old bridge was mostly demolished, to make way for a brand new concrete one, with slip ramps and wider lanes. Since then, a number of maintenance and modernisation projects have been executed.

The bridge is located in the Giulești neighborhood of Sector 6 of the city. It is passed by a tram way (line 41), which was upgraded while Traian Băsescu was mayor, becoming the first lightrail line in Bucharest.

Today, the bridge connects Crângași Square with Turda Street, crossing west–east over Giulești Boulevard, the railroads and Grivița Boulevard. It is one of the symbols of the football club București, its stadium being located right by the bridge.

See also
List of bridges in Romania

References

Buildings and structures in Bucharest
Grant
Grant
Road-rail bridges
Railway bridges in Romania
Steel bridges
Concrete bridges